is a railway station on the Hitahikosan Line in Soeda, Fukuoka, Japan, operated by Kyushu Railway Company (JR Kyushu).

Lines
Soeda Station is served by the Hitahikosan Line. Since July 2017, there has been no rail service south of Soeda to  due to rainstorm damage. This section of the line will not be restored as a railway and it was confirmed by local communities and JR Kyushu that the section will be replaced by bus rapid transit (BRT). The BRT route is estimated to be completed by 2023.

Adjacent stations

See also
 List of railway stations in Japan

External links

  

Railway stations in Fukuoka Prefecture
Railway stations in Japan opened in 1915